de Charlton or De Charlton is a surname. Notable people with the name include the following:

Roger de Charlton, English Archdeacon (fl. 1325 - 1338)
Thomas de Charlton, English Archdeacon (fl. 1302)

See also

 Charlton (surname)
 Charlton (given name)
Lewis de Charleton